Johanna G. Nešlehová is a Czech mathematical statistician who works in Canada at McGill University as a professor in the department of mathematics and statistics. Her research interests include copulas, extreme value theory, multivariate statistics, and operational risk.

Education and career
Nešlehová is originally from Prague, the daughter of painter Pavel Nešleha and art historian . She studied at the Charles University, the University of Hamburg, and the University of Oldenburg, earning a degree (vordiplom) from University of Hamburg in 1999, a master's degree (diplom) from the University of Hamburg in 2000, and a doctorate from the University of Oldenburg in 2004.

After working as a postdoctoral researcher and Heinz Hopf Lecturer at ETH Zürich, she joined the McGill University faculty in 2009. Since October 2022 she is also a professor at WU Vienna University of Economics and Business.

Book
With Erhard Cramer, Nešlehová is the author of a German-language undergraduate textbook in introductory mathematics, Vorkurs Mathematik: Arbeitsbuch zum Studienbeginn in Bachelor-Studiengängen (Springer, 2005; 7th ed., 2018).

Recognition
Nešlehová was named as an Elected Member of the International Statistical Institute in 2011. In 2020 she was named a Fellow of the Institute of Mathematical Statistics.

She was the 2019 winner of the CRM-SSC Prize in Statistics "for fundamental contributions to multivariate statistics, and in particular stochastic dependence modeling and extreme-value theory, and for her efforts to promote the sound application of statistics in risk management".

References

External links

Year of birth missing (living people)
Living people
Czech statisticians
Canadian statisticians
Women statisticians
Charles University alumni
University of Hamburg alumni
University of Oldenburg alumni
Academic staff of McGill University
Elected Members of the International Statistical Institute
Fellows of the Institute of Mathematical Statistics